The Expert Group Meeting (EGM): prevention of violence against women and girls was convened as part of the United Nations Commission on the Status of Women's multi-year programme of work for 2010-2014. The "Elimination and prevention of all forms of violence against women and girls" forms a priority theme for its fifty-seventh session in 2013 (CSW57). The meeting took place in Bangkok, Thailand, 17–20 September 2012 and was organised by the United Nations Entity for Gender Equality and the Empowerment of Women (UN Women), in collaboration with the following organisations:
United Nations Economic and Social Commission for Asia and the Pacific (ESCAP);
United Nations Development Programme (UNDP);
United Nations Population Fund (UNFPA);
United Nations Children's Fund (UNICEF) and;
World Health Organization (WHO).

Participants

See also

 CEDAW
 Convention on preventing and combating violence against women and domestic violence
 Declaration on the Elimination of Discrimination against Women
 Declaration on the Elimination of Violence Against Women
 Gender Equality Architecture Reform
 Global Implementation Plan to End Violence against Women and Girls
 NGO CSW/NY
 United Nations Development Fund for Women
 United Nations International Research and Training Institute for the Advancement of Women
 United Nations Security Council Resolution 1325
 Women's rights

References

External links
 Beijing Platform for Action (BPfA), UN Women. Retrieved 28 February 2013.
 Original copy of the EGM report (as a downloadable pdf) and all documentation. Retrieved 8 March 2013.

Feminism and history
Anti-discrimination law
Women's rights
Reproductive rights
Feminism and society
Women in society
Women's studies
Sexualization
Violence against women